The following list is a discography of production by Danja, an American music producer from Virginia Beach, Virginia. It includes a list of songs produced, co-produced and remixed by year, artist, album and title.

Singles produced

2003

Blackstreet - Level II 
 10. Why, Why (produced with Teddy Riley and Natural Blend)

Fabolous - Street Dreams 
 14. Forgive Me Father

2005

Nickelus F 
 00. I Am What I Am (produced by Tommy Hittz)

Wyld - ??? 
 00. Hey
 00. Drankin'

CaliStylz 
 00. Big Dreams
 00. Buewtiful Thang
 00. Pink Pantha (featuring O)
 00. Motivation On 100 (featuring O)
 00. Shatiez (featuring Wyld & Smoke)
 00. Patty Cake (featuring Wyld & Hollow)
 00. 64 Leanin' (co-produced by Rikki Allsum)
 00. What It Does
 00. That Dopica
 00. To The Top (Ft. Nick Rage)

J-EyE - ??? 
 00. Say What huh

Justin Timberlake - Shark Tale: OST 
 00. Good Foot (Credited for "Additional Sweetening") (produced with Timbaland)

The Black Eyed Peas - Monkey Business 
 03. My Style (featuring Justin Timberlake) (produced with Timbaland)

The Notorious B.I.G. - Duets: The Final Chapter 
 04. Whatchu Want (featuring JAY-Z)

Keri Hilson - In The Mix OST 
 05. Hands & Feet

Ginuwine - Back II Da Basics 
 09. Betta Half

2006

Nelly Furtado - Loose 
 01. Afraid (feat. Attitude)  (produced with Timbaland)
 04. Glow  (produced with Timbaland)
 05. Showtime
 06. No Hay Igual (produced with Timbaland & Nisan Stewart)
 08. Say It Right (produced with Timbaland)
 09. Do It (produced with Timbaland)
 11. Wait For You (produced with Timbaland)
 12. All Good Things (Come to an End) (produced with Timbaland)

Nelly Furtado - Loose 
 00. Maneater (Remix) (featuring Lil' Wayne) (produced with Timbaland)

Justin Timberlake - FutureSex/LoveSounds 
 01. FutureSex/LoveSounds (produced with Timbaland and Justin Timberlake)
 02. SexyBack (featuring Timbaland) (produced with Timbaland and Justin Timberlake)
 03. Sexy Ladies - Let Me Talk to You (Prelude) (produced with Timbaland and Justin Timberlake)
 04. My Love (featuring T.I.) (produced with Timbaland and Justin Timberlake)
 05. LoveStoned/I Think She Knows (Interlude) (produced with Timbaland and Justin Timberlake)
 06. What Goes Around/Comes Around (Interlude) (produced with Timbaland and Justin Timberlake)
 07. Chop Me Up (featuring Timbaland & Three 6 Mafia) (produced with Timbaland and Justin Timberlake)
 09. Summer Love - Set the Mood (Prelude) (produced with Timbaland and Justin Timberlake)
 10. Until The End Of Time (featuring The Benjamin Wright Orchestra) (produced with Timbaland and Justin Timberlake)
 11. Losing My Way (featuring Timbaland & Hezekiah Walker and the Love Fellowship Crusade Choir) (produced with Timbaland and Justin Timberlake)
 12. Until The End Of Time (produced with Timbaland and Justin Timberlake)

Lloyd Banks - Little Man (ST) & Promo Single For Rotten Apple
 00. My House (featuring 50 Cent) (produced with Timbaland)

Diddy - Press Play 
 08. Wanna Move (featuring Ciara, Big Boi & Scar) (additional production by Big Boi)
 09. Diddy Rock (featuring Timbaland, Twista & Shawnna)
 14. After Love (featuring Keri Hilson) (produced with Timbaland)

Jeannie Ortega - No Place Like BKLYN 
 00. So Done (Remix)

Snoop Dogg - Tha Blue Carpet Treatment 
 07. Get a Light (featuring Damian Marley) (produced with Timbaland)

Danity Kane - Danity Kane 
 03. Want It (produced with Timbaland)
 04. Right Now (produced with Timbaland)

Fantasia Barrino - Fantasia 
 09. Uneligible
 12. Bore Me (Yawn)

Keshia Chanté - 2U 
 11. Too Much

2007

Katharine McPhee - Katharine McPhee 
 01. Love Story
 03. Open Toes
 05. Not Ur Girl
 06. Each Other
 07. Dangerous
 11. Neglected

8Ball & MJG - Ridin High 
 01. Intro
 04. Turn Up the Bump

Björk - Volta 
 01. Earth Intruders (produced with Björk and Timbaland)
 04. Innocence (produced with Björk and Timbaland)
 08. Hope (co-produced with Björk and Timbaland)

DJ Khaled - We The Best 
 03. We Takin' Over (featuring Akon, T.I., Rick Ross, Fat Joe, Birdman & Lil' Wayne)

Timbaland - Timbaland Presents Shock Value 
 02. Give It to Me (featuring Nelly Furtado & Justin Timberlake) (co-produced with Timbaland)
 04. The Way I Are (featuring Keri Hilson & D.O.E.) (co-produced with Timbaland)
 06. Come & Get Me (featuring 50 Cent & Tony Yayo) (co-produced with Timbaland)
 08. Boardmeeting (featuring Magoo) (co-produced with Timbaland)
 10. Scream (featuring Keri Hilson & Nicole Scherzinger) (co-produced with Timbaland)
 11. Miscommunication (featuring Keri Hilson & Sebastian)

Timbaland - Give It to Me (Laff at Em) (Remix) - Single 
 00. Give It to Me (Laff at Em) (Remix) (featuring Justin Timberlake & JAY-Z) (co-produced with Timbaland)

Wyld Money - Street Power (Mixtape) 
 03. Chitty Rollin'
 04. Ease Off Me
 05. Recognize (Bring To The Streetz)
 07. Street Power (featuring O)
 08. Tuff Muthafucka (Cock That, Pop That)
 09. Cocky (featuring Freeway)
 11. I Get U Nigga
 12. Is U Wit Me

T.I. - T.I. Vs. T.I.P. 
 07.	"Hurt" (featuring Alfamega & Busta Rhymes)
 16. Tell 'Em I Said That
 17. Respect This Hustle

50 Cent - Curtis 
 07. Ayo Technology (featuring Justin Timberlake & Timbaland) (co-produced with Timbaland)

B5 - Don't Talk, Just Listen 
 06. Tear Drops

Britney Spears - Blackout 
 01. Gimme More
 04. Break the Ice
 06. Get Naked (I Got a Plan)
 09. Hot as Ice
 11. Perfect Lover
 13. Outta This World [Japanese Bonus Track]
 15. Get Back [Japanese Bonus Track]
 00. Hot As Ice (Remix) [Unreleased]
 00. 911 [Unreleased]
 00. Dramatic [Unreleased]
 00. Kiss You All Over [Unreleased]

Duran Duran - Red Carpet Massacre 
 01. The Valley [produced with Duran Duran and Jimmy Douglass]	
 02. Red Carpet Massacre [produced with Duran Duran and Jimmy Douglass]	
 03. Nite Runner (featuring Justin Timberlake and Timbaland) (produced with Duran Duran, Justin Timberlake and Timbaland)	
 05. Box Full O' Honey [produced with Duran Duran and Jimmy Douglass]	
 06. Skin Divers (featuring Timbaland) [produced with Timbaland and Duran Duran]	
 07. Tempted [produced with Duran Duran and Jimmy Douglass]
 08. Tricked Out [produced with Duran Duran and Jimmy Douglass]
 09. Zoom In [produced with Duran Duran and Timbaland]	
 10. She's Too Much [produced with Duran Duran and Jimmy Douglass]	
 11. Dirty Great Monster [produced with Duran Duran and Jimmy Douglass]	
 12. Last Man Standing [produced with Duran Duran and Jimmy Douglass]

Natasha Bedingfield - N.B./Pocketful of Sunshine 
 11. Not Givin' Up

Yung Berg - Almost Famous EP 
 06. Painkiller (with Nikki Flores)

Nikki Flores - This Girl (Unreleased) 
 03. Suffocate
 05. Painkiller
 11. Beautiful Boy (feat. Baléwa Muhammad)

Menudo - Unreleased 
 More Than Words
 Young Lovers
 Surrounded
 Save The Day

2008

Layzie Bone - Thugz Nation 
 06. Bone Thug Boyz (feat. Krayzie Bone and Wish Bone)

Simple Plan - Simple Plan 
 01. When I'm Gone (produced with Dave Fortman)
 03. The End (produced with Dave Fortman)
 04. Your Love Is a Lie (produced with Dave Fortman)
 06. Generation (produced with Dave Fortman and Max Martin)

Step Up 2: The Streets - Step Up 2 the Streets (soundtrack) 
 11. Bayje - "Impossible"
 14. Kevin Cossom - "Say Cheese"

Fat Joe - The Elephant in the Room 
 04. Cocababy (featuring Jackie Rubio)

Danity Kane - Welcome to the Dollhouse 
 02. Bad Girl (featuring Missy Elliott)
 04. Pretty Boy (Produced with The Clutch)
 05. Strip Tease
 00. Stop Time

Quinton Storm - The Calm Before The Storm (Mixtape) 
 05. I Know What Girls Like

Day26 - Day26 
 03. In My Bed

Mariah Carey - E=MC² 
 01. Migrate (featuring T-Pain)

Calistylz - Calistylulated: The Animation (Mixtape) 
 03. Two In Da Mournin
 10. Make It Happen
 12. Rock Hard (featuring Owe)
 15. Real Live
 19. Pattycake (featuring Smoke, Wyld & Hollow)
 20. Downtown (featuring Hollow)
 21. Top Guinna

Lil Mama - VYP: Voice of the Young People 
 06. What It Is (Strike a Pose) (featuring T-Pain)

Madonna - Hard Candy 
 02. 4 Minutes (featuring. Justin Timberlake and Timbaland) (produced with Timbaland & Justin Timberlake)
 05. Miles Away (produced with Timbaland & Justin Timberlake)
 11. Devil Wouldn't Recognize You (produced with Timbaland & Justin Timberlake)
 12. Voices (produced with Timbaland & Justin Timberlake and co-produced by Hannon Lane)
00. "Across The Sky" (featuring. Justin Timberlake) (produced with Timbaland & Justin Timberlake)
00. "Across The Sky (Timbaland Remix)" (featuring. Timbaland & Justin Timberlake) (produced with Timbaland & Justin Timberlake)
00. "Animal" (featuring. Justin Timberlake) (produced with Timbaland & Justin Timberlake)
00. "Latte (La La)" (produced with Timbaland)
00. "Infinity" (produced with Timbaland & Justin Timberlake)

Usher - Here I Stand 
 13. "Appetite"

Wyld Money - Street Power 2 (Mixtape) 
 01. Intro
 02. I'ma Go Hard
 05. Money Maker (feat. Hollow & Owe)
 07. Baby I See You (feat. Owe & Smoke)
 08. I'm Da Shit (feat. Hollow)
 10. No Longer
 11. Love In Lenox
 12. Can I Get That
 16. Last Of A Fast Dying Breed

Donnie Klang  - Just a Rolling Stone 
 08. "Catch My Breath"

T.I. - Paper Trail 
 07. "No Matter What"

DJ Khaled - We Global 
 08. "She's Fine" (featuring Missy Elliott, Sean Paul & Busta Rhymes)

Pink - Funhouse 
 02. "Sober" (produced with Jimmy Harry and Tony Kanal)

Britney Spears - Circus 
 04. Kill the Lights
 08. Blur
 15. Rock Boy [iTunes bonus track]
 00. Abroad [Unreleased]
 00. Take the Bait [Unreleased]
 00. Flame Thrower [Unreleased]
 00. Follow (One) [Unreleased]

Prima J - Prima J 
 15. "Take It To The Maximum" (produced with Timbaland)

2009

Francesca Ramirez - Gotta Know (Promo) (Unreleased) 
00. Gotta Know
(Produced With Timbaland)

Keri Hilson - In A Perfect World... 
 03. "Get Your Money Up" (produced with Polow Da Don)
 05. "Knock You Down" (feat. Ne-Yo, Kanye West)
 08. "Intuition" (additional production)
 09. "How Does It Feel" (produced with Timbaland)
 11. "Tell Him The Truth"
 14. "Where Did He Go?" (produced with Timbaland)
 15. "Quicksand" (Exclusive Amazon Bonus Track)

Whitney Houston - I Look to You 
 02. "Nothin' But Love"
 09. "For The Lovers"

Ciara - Fantasy Ride 
 04. "Turntables" (featuring Chris Brown)
 08. "Work" (featuring Missy Elliott)
 14. "Echo" (Deluxe Edition Bonus Track)

Busta Rhymes - Back on My B.S. 
 04. "Shoot for the Moon"
 00. "Freakin' You" (featuring Missy Elliott & Ne-Yo)

Esmée Denters - Outta Here 
 11. "Casanova" (featuring. Justin Timberlake) (Produced with Justin Timberlake)

Kevin Cossom - Hook vs. Bridge - The Mixtape 
 01. "She Got a Boyfriend"
 04. "Relax" (feat. Snoop Dogg)
 08. "My Ex (Remix)" (feat. Joe Budden)
 10. "Withdrawals"
 14. "Hang Over My Head"
 15. "My Ex (Original Version)" (feat. Rick Ross)

Dizzee Rascal - Tongue n' Cheek 
 11. "Bad Behaviour" (with Tiësto)

T.I. - Paper Trail: Case Closed EP 
 05. "Hell Of A Life"

Tiësto - Kaleidoscope 
 04. "I Will Be Here" (feat. Sneaky Sound System) (with Tiësto)

Snoop Dogg - Malice n Wonderland 
 08. That's tha Homie

2010

Christina Aguilera - Bionic 
15. You Lost Me (Radio Remix)

Ciara - Unreleased Tracks 
00. "One More Dance"

Rick Ross - Teflon Don 
07. "No. 1" (feat. Diddy & Trey Songz)

Usher - Raymond v. Raymond 
11. "So Many Girls" (additional vocals by Diddy)
00. "Stay Down"

T.I. - No Mercy 
11. "Everything on Me"

Diddy-Dirty Money - Last Train to Paris 
 03. "Yeah Yeah You Would" (feat. Grace Jones)
 06. "Hate You Now"
 14. "Hello Good Morning" (feat. T.I.)

Keri Hilson - No Boys Allowed 
 07. "Toy Soldier" (co-written with Keri)
 16. "So Good" (Target Deluxe Edition Track)

Jamie Foxx - Best Night of My Life 
 05. "Freak" (feat. Rico Love)

M.I.A. - Vicki Leekx 
 12. "Bad Girls"

2011

Jennifer Lopez - Love? 
 11. "Starting Over"

DJ Khaled - We the Best Forever 
 07. "Sleep When I'm Gone"  Feat. Cee-Lo Green, Game & Busta Rhymes

Cody Simpson - Coast to Coast 
 01. "Good As It Gets"
 02. "Crazy But True"

Joe Jonas - Fastlife 
 01. "All This Time"
 04. "Love Slayer"
 06. "Make You Mine"
 09. "Not Right Now"
 10. "Take It And Run"

Mary J. Blige - My Life II... The Journey Continues (Act 1) 
 04. "Next Level" (featuring Busta Rhymes)
 08. "No Condition"

2012

Usher - Looking 4 Myself 
04. "I Care for U"
05. "Show Me"

Tank - This Is How I Feel 
07. "This Is How I Feel"

Chris Brown - Fortune 
03. "Till I Die" (featuring Big Sean and Wiz Khalifa)

Brandy - Two Eleven 
 14. "Can You Hear Me Now?"

Wiz Khalifa - O.N.I.F.C. 
 17. "Medicated" (featuring Chevy Woods & Juicy J)

Luke James - Whispers in the Dark 
 01.   "Intro"
 02.   "Hurt Me"
 03.   "Oh God Feat. Hit-Boy"
 04.   "Be Bad"
 05.   "Heart Beat"
 06.   "Strawberry Vapors"
 08.   "Love Chile"
 09.   "The Audacity (Interlude)"
 11.   "Outro"

2013

Wyld - Street Power 3 
 01. "Intro"
 02. "Bass Out Tha Trunk"
 03. "So Hella" feat. Future
 04. "Underworld" feat. Luke James
 05. "What's Your Life Like"
 06. "Night Night" feat. Danja
 07. "Fadin"
 08. "Better Quality"
 09. "10,000,000" feat. Danja
 10. "Ego Man"
 11. "Street Propaganda" feat. Owe & The Clipse
 12. "Hourglass"
 13. "Credits Roll"

Kelly Rowland - Talk a Good Game 
01. "Freak"

M.I.A. - The Bling Ring (Original Motion Picture Soundtrack) 
04. "Bad Girls"

2014

Kid Ink - My Own Lane 
02. "The Movement"

Eric Bellinger - The Rebirth (Eric Bellinger album) 
15. "Amateur Night"

Fat Joe - (Ft. Jennifer Lopez) 
01. "Stressin'"

Chris Brown - X (Chris Brown album) 
02. "Add Me In"
09. "Stereotype"

Luke James - Luke James 
01. "Love XYZ"
05. "The Run"
07. "Exit Wounds"
08. "TimeX (Interlude)"
10. "Insane/Bombin' Out (Interlude)"

2015

Rico Love - Turn the Lights On 
03. "Trifling"
04. "Ride"
07. "Days Go By"

Jason Derulo - Everything Is 4 
11. "X2CU"

GhosMerck - Distorted Noize 
10. "Throw It Up"

Rico Love - Days Go By (Promo) 
00 "Days Go By"

Caligula - Road 2 Riches (Promo) 
00 "Road 2 Riches"

Meek Mill - Dreams Worth More Than Money 
13. "Stand Up"

DJ Khaled - I Changed a Lot 
04. "I Swear I Never Tell Another Soul" (featuring Future, Yo Gotti and Trick Daddy)

Chris Brown - Royalty 
10. "Discover"

Monica - Code Red 
07. "Deep" (produced with Polow Da Don)

2016

K. Michelle - More Issues Than Vogue 
05. "If It Ain't Love"

2017

DJ Khaled - Grateful 
01. "(Intro) I'm So Grateful" (featuring Sizzla)
02. "Shining" (featuring Beyoncé and Jay Z)
06. "On Everything" (featuring Travis Scott, Rick Ross and Big Sean)
12. "I Can't Even Lie" (featuring Future & Nicki Minaj)

Agnez Mo - X 
01. "Million $ Lover"
02. "Long As I Get Paid"
03. "Sorry"
04. "Level Up!"
05. "Wanna Be Loved"
07. "Karma"
09. "Beautiful Mistake"
10. "Get What You Give"

Gucci Mane - Mr. Davis 
10. "We Ride" (featuring Monica)
16. "Miss My Woe" (featuring Rico Love)

Keyshia Cole - 11:11 Reset 
4. "Incapable" (produced with Patrick Hayes)

Chris Brown - Heartbreak on a Full Moon 
22. "Only 4 Me" (featuring Ty Dolla $ign and Verse Simmonds)

2018

Justin Timberlake - Man of the Woods 
01. "Filthy" (Co-produced with Justin Timberlake & Timbaland)
03. "Sauce (Co-produced with Justin Timberlake & Timbaland)
09. "Say Something" (featuring Chris Stapleton) (Co-produced with Justin Timberlake & Timbaland)

2019
Will Smith –  Aladdin (2019 soundtrack)
11. "Friend Like Me (End title)" 

Big K.R.I.T. - K.R.I.T. Iz Here
06. "Energy" 
07. "Obvious" 
19. "M.I.S.S.I.S.S.I.P.P.I."

Beyoncé - The Lion King: The Gift
12. "Mood 4 Eva" 

BJ the Chicago Kid - 1123  
01. "Feel the Vibe" 
02. "Champagne"

2021
Kelly Clarkson – When Christmas Comes Around... 
06. "Glow"

2022
Hayley Kiyoko - Panorama
01. "Sugar at the Bottom" 
02. "Luna" 
03. "For the Girls" 
04. "Flicker Start" 
05. "Underground" 
06. "Forever" 
07. "Deep in the Woods" 
08. "Supposed to Be"
09. "Chance"
12. "Found My Friends"

Upcoming

Britney Spears - TBA 

 Welcome To The Jungle
 Fuck What You Know
 Demonstrate
 Marilyn Monroe
 Beauty Is A Beast
 Be Yourself
 Hold Me Closer (With Elton John) (Bonus Track)
 It's Not Enough
 Malibu
 Night Sweats
 Psychotic
 Real Real
 Sequel
 My Own Way
 Me Time
 Traffic For 2 Hours
 Thunk It
 WATERMELON .... and SALT
 Apple Pie
 A Girl With New Hair
Snake (Pick It Up) (With Billie Eilish)
 Take Me Back
 I Made It To Paradise
 Enchanté
 Here For It (With Justin Bieber)
 Skinny As A Needle
 My Kind Of Place
 Miami With Mi Amor
 Blue Is My Favourite
 Time
 A New Closet, A New World
 In The Tub
 Mary Magdalene
 My Kind Of Place
 I Feel So Free With You (Remix with Pitbull, Marc Anthony, Cardi B, Ozuna, Drake & Marshmello)

Missy Elliott - Block Party (TBA) 
 Best, Best
 Trainwreck

Cassie - Electro Love (TBA) 
 Official Girl
 Official Girl (Remix) (feat. Lil Wayne)
 Look What You Done

Jada - TBA 
 Denial (co-produced by The Clutch)

JoJo 
 "Sexy to Me"

Jesse McCartney - Have It All 
03. "The Writer"

Travis Garland - "Believe" 
 Believe
 Don't Leave Me Rose
 Killer

References

Notes 

Production discographies
Discographies of American artists
Hip hop discographies